Transylvania Twist is a 1989 comedy film that parodies horror films. Originally released by Concord Production Inc., this film is distributed on home video by Metro-Goldwyn-Mayer. In the film Angus Scrimm reprises his role of the "Tall Man" from the Phantasm films, as a parody. The humor of the film is most often said to be in the style of Airplane!, and Mel Brooks comedies. It occasionally breaks the fourth wall rule with characters looking at the camera, and one even saying "I'm in the wrong movie". The film's main theme has been released on a variety of albums, it and the entire soundtrack was released on CD and as a direct download in the year 2010, twenty-one years after the movies initial release.

It was directed by Jim Wynorski, who made over 150 films. In 2013 he said this film "comes closest to my personality and was the film I had the most fun making. It was the show I never wanted to end".

Plot summary
The film opens with two short sequences before the main story line begins, first a prologue, and then a mock television advertisement. In the prologue, a seemingly helpless young woman is pursued by Jason Voorhees, Leatherface, and Freddy Krueger; she is then chased into a cave and reappears a few seconds later with an item from each of the three. She then faces the camera and laughs (showing her fangs) and says, "Amateurs!" The advertisement sequence is for a "mortuary, crematory, cemetery" called "Death City" where a salesman tries selling viewers "new and used coffins", with the help of his assistant Lovely Rita.

Dexter Ward (Steve Altman) enters a 'Death City' location, and is greeted by two morticians, one of which is noted science fiction anthologist Forrest J. Ackerman in a cameo appearance, who is holding a copy of Famous Monsters of Filmland. Dexter is there for the funeral of his uncle, who is suffering from a 'medical condition' and not actually dead. After helping his uncle out of the coffin and back to a library, Dexter is then sent by his uncle Ephram (Jay Robinson) to find and bring back The Book of Ulthar, a book of great power capable of unleashing terrible evil in the wrong hands; librarian Ephram had mistakenly let someone check it out. Dexter's search leads him to aspiring singing star Marissa Orlock (Teri Copley), who is about to be informed of the death of her father Marinas (Howard Morris), and her inheritance of Castle Orlock in Transylvania. Dexter goes with her to the castle.

Victor Van Helsing (Ace Mask), a professional vampire hunter, accompanies Marissa and Dexter to the castle as the executor of her father's estate. Count Byron Orlock (Robert Vaughn), and his three adopted-daughters who are also vampires are already at the castle. One of them is named Patricia (Monique Gabrielle) the seemingly helpless girl in the prologue. When 'viewing the will' they find out that Marissa has been left the castle and the money, while Orlock was left luggage. As a toss-up gift, they are left to find the book somewhere within the castle. Orlock is determined to find the book so that he can create an age of evil; assisting him is the butler Stephan (Angus Scrimm).

The book is finally found by Dexter but Byron steals it from him and uses it to summon an enormous monster called The Evil One (which was originally seen in It Conquered the World), but Dexter and Marissa (who is possessed by her ancestor of the same name) stops him, while Dexter is freed and destroys the book. The possessed Marissa blasts Byron with a lightning bolt, but as he burns to death he declares that he'll be back in the sequel.

Marinas, who was suffering from a cataleptic seizure and was not dead, tells Marissa that she must stay in the castle to ensure that the monster never returns; Helsing, who is now a vampire, also stays. Dexter arranges for Marissa to make her latest music video in the castle, with the help of her vampire cousins and Helsing.

The film ends with the local villagers, who throughout the film have been trying to find the castle so they can destroy it, finally give up and go home.

Cast

Robert Vaughn . . . Lord Byron Orlock
Teri Copley . . . Marissa Orlock
Steve Altman . . . Dexter Ward
Ace Mask . . . Victor Von Helsing
Angus Scrimm . . . Stefen
Steve Franken . . . Hans Hoff
Vinette Cecelia . . . Laverne
Monique Gabrielle . . . Patty (Patricia)
Howard Morris . . . Marinas Orlock
Jay Robinson . . . Uncle Ephram
Lenny Juliano . . . Maxie Fields
Joe Lerer . . . Hans Downe
Clement von Franckenstein . . . Hans Hoff
R.J. Robertson . . . Hans Phull
 Arthur Roberts . . . Hans N. Fritz
Toni Naples . . . Maxine
Frazer Smith . . . Slick Lambert
Becky LeBeau . . . Rita
Stu Nahan . . . Sports Announcer
Jack Behr . . . Direttore
Kelli Maroney . . . Hannah
Michael Chieffo . . . Ed Norton Look-Alike
Jon Locke . . . Mr. Sweeney
Magda Harout . . . Peasant Woman
Deanna Lund . . . Insegnante
Brinke Stevens . . . Betty Lou
Harriet Harris . . . Granny
Michael Vlastas . . . James Vasvolakas
Art Hern . . . Willoughby
Dean Jones (as Dean C. Jones) . . . Pinhead
Boris Karloff. . . Himself (archive footage)

Inspirations, parodies, and puns
Mark Thomas McGee worked on an early draft of the script for about a week. He was fired at the request for Roger Corman who told Wynorski that he was difficult to work with.

Most of the film consists of silly moments of comedy and parody; e.g., when Pinhead steps out of an acupuncturist's office and says, "I don't care what anyone says — this hurts!" At one point, Dexter looks into a room and meets Boris Karloff (in a clip from the movie The Terror); in another, Dexter and Marissa step into a room that's apparently in 3-D, but because neither of them is wearing 3-D glasses, all they see is jumbled red and green.

Many of the films characters are parodies of other sources, including; Dexter Ward from The Case of Charles Dexter Ward, Byron Orlock from Targets, Van Helsing from Dracula, and the mock advertisement scene's Lovely Rita. Television shows are also referenced such as The Honeymooners, The Late Show, Meet the Press, The Twilight Zone, and Wheel of Fortune. The film also contains puns such as "Vampires of the Caribbean", "Elvis has left the body", and "Papa-Oom-Mow-Mow" being spoken as part of the spell to summon the Evil One as well as classic gags such as a Pie in the face for the Ayatollah, and Dexter finding a Skeleton in the closet.

Films being parodied are:
 Nightmare on Elm Street: the character Freddy Krueger with Swiss Army knife glove.
 Casablanca
 The Exorcist: at the séance scene, including the spewing of green liquid from the mouth.
 Friday the 13th films: the character Jason Voorhees.
 The Haunted Palace: the summoning of the 'Evil One' scenes.
 Hellraiser: the character Pinhead.
 Horror of Dracula: meeting the daughters, Van Helsing pointing out blood on a vampire's mouth, and Byron throwing back of female vampire from her intended victim.
 It Conquered the World: the 'Evil One' creature.
 Night of the Living Dead: the lines "Yeah, they're dead--they're all messed up".
 Phantasm: the 'Tall Man' character with Angus Scrimm parodying himself in the role.
 Taxi Driver: the lines "You talking to me, no one else here you must be talking to me".
 Texas Chainsaw Massacre films: character Leatherface.
 The Terror: footage of Boris Karloff.

The film title comes from a line in the 1962 song "Monster Mash".

Home media
The film was released on VHS on September 22, 1993 and on DVD on March 27, 2001.

Reception
The film received mixed reviews, from positive reviews such as "what might be the best of the late-80′s wave of Naked Gun inspired horror spoofs", to the more negative reviews that state "moronic comedy about vampires, teenage vampire hunters and half-naked babes". One of its most positive reviews comes from Variety stating that "mixed into the cosmic stew are many delightful reflexive bits", and that it "is an occasionally hilarious horror spoof notable for the range of its comical targets".
 2 and half stars out of 4 - TV Guide
 2 and a half stars out of 5 - Video Movie Guide 2002
 2 stars out of 4 - Creature Features: The Science Fiction, Fantasy, and Horror Movie Guide
 2 out of 4 - Cinefantastique review by J. P. Harris
 1 and a half Bones out of 4 - VideoHound's Golden Movie Retriever
 1 and a half stars out of 5 - All Movie.com
 1 star out of 5 - AMC (TV channel)

Soundtrack
After the film's original release its theme was released as part of the album "Vampire Circus (The Essential Vampire Theme Collection)" by Silva Screen Records in 1993. On the 1997 album "Vampire Themes" by Cleopatra Records, the band 'Ex Voto' remixes and reinterprets the main theme. The entire soundtrack was then officially released on June 7, 2010, when it was paired with the soundtrack to Not of This Earth also composed by Chuck Cirino. It is currently sold in Compact Disk, and direct download formats from various music sites.

Transylvania Twist
 Amateurs
 Transylvania Twist Main Titles
 Just Give Me Action
 Come To Castle Orlock
 The Road To Hansberg/Van Helsing Before Dinner
 Think Of The Royalties
 Ancestors Of Orlock
 Marinas' Service
 Stefan's Favorite Musical Recording
 The Newlydead Game
 Seance For Lady Marissa
 Trick Or Treat/Swing And A Miss
 Marissa Points The Way/Dexter Finds The Book
 The Evil One Appears
 Destroy The Book
 Transylvania Twist End Titles

Not of This Earth
17. Not Of This Earth Main Title
18. I'm Coming Home/Dining Out
19. Miss Story's Bedroom/First Communication
20. Several Hundred Questions
21. Sleeze-O-Mania
22. Birthday Girl
23. A Pound And A Half of Flesh
24. Footchase
25. Finding Out
26. Stop Running, Nadine
27. Driving Mr. Johnson
28. Not Of This Earth End TitlesBonus Tracks
29. Transylvania Twist Suite
30. Chopping Mall Suite
31. Not Of This Earth End Titles (Alternate)
32. Death City

See also
 Abbott and Costello Meet Frankenstein
 Dracula: Dead and Loving It
 Scary Movie
 Young Frankenstein

References

External links
 
 
 Transylvania Twist production credits, New York Times

1989 films
1980s parody films
1980s comedy horror films
American comedy horror films
1980s English-language films
Films directed by Jim Wynorski
Parodies of horror
1989 comedy films
1980s American films